Sabra (formerly Turenne during the French colonization) is a commune of Tlemcen in Algeria., it has a famous water source called ain sabra

References

Communes of Tlemcen Province
Cities in Algeria